Brenner Marlos Varanda de Oliveira (born 1 March 1994), known as Brenner Marlos or just Brenner, is a Brazilian footballer who plays as a forward for Liga 1 club Sporting Cristal.

Career statistics

In May 2019, he joined Avaí.

Club

Notes

Honours

Remo
Campeonato Paraense: 2022

References

External links

1994 births
Living people
Brazilian footballers
People from Várzea Grande, Mato Grosso
Association football forwards
Campeonato Brasileiro Série D players
Campeonato Brasileiro Série C players
Campeonato Brasileiro Série B players
Campeonato Brasileiro Série A players
Esporte Clube Juventude players
Sport Club Internacional players
Botafogo de Futebol e Regatas players
Goiás Esporte Clube players
Avaí FC players
Sportspeople from Mato Grosso